The YJ-62 is a Chinese subsonic anti-ship cruise missile. It is manufactured by the China Aerospace Science and Industry Corporation Third Academy.

Description

The 2017 CSMI report notes that such long range suggests that the missile receives targeting from other platforms.

The missile is deployed aboard Type 052C destroyers, and by coastal defence units using three-round transporter erector launchers.

C-602
The C-602 is the export version of the YJ-62, claimed to have a range of 280 km, a  semi-armour-piercing warhead, and GPS guidance. The reduced range is in accordance with Missile Technology Control Regime restrictions.

The C-602 was revealed in September 2005, and displayed outside of China for the first time at the African Aerospace and Defence exhibition in 2006.

CM-602G
The CM-602G is a land-attack version of the C-602.

The missile was revealed at the China International Aviation & Aerospace Exhibition in 2012.

Operators

People's Liberation Army Navy
Type 052C destroyer
People's Liberation Army Navy Coastal Defense Force: 120+ 

Naval Strategic Forces Command: C-602 used in coastal defence role; Pakistani designation Zarb.

References

See also
CJ-10 cruise missile - Similar land-attack cruise missile operated by the PLA Second Artillery Corps, unveiled in 2009

Guided missiles of the People's Republic of China
Air-to-surface missiles
Anti-ship cruise missiles of the People's Republic of China
Military equipment introduced in the 2000s